{{Infobox government agency
| native_name_a = मंत्रालय नियोजनविभाग महाराष्ट्र शासन| type = ministry
| name = Ministry of Planning, Government of Maharashtra
| native_name = 
| seal = File:Seal of Maharashtra.png
| seal_width = 200
| seal_caption = Seal of the state of Maharashtra
| logo = 
| logo_width = 
| logo_caption = 
| picture              = Mantralay of Mumbai, Administrative Headquarters 03.jpg
| picture_caption      = Building of Administrative Headquarters of Mumbai
| picture_width = 
| jurisdiction =  Maharashtra
| headquarters = Mantralay, Mumbai
| region_code = IN
| minister1_name = Devendra Fadnavis| minister1_pfo = Deputy Chief Minister
| deputyminister1_name = Vacant, TBDsince 29 June 2022
| deputyminister1_pfo =  Minister of State
| child1_agency = 
| child2_agency = 
| website = 
| formed = 
| employees = 
| budget = 
| chief1_name = (IAS)
| chief1_position = 
| chief2_name = 
| chief2_position = 
| parent_department = Government of Maharashtra
}}

The Ministry of Planning is a ministry of the Government of Maharashtra. It is responsible for preparing annual plans for the development of Maharashtra state.

The Ministry is headed by a cabinet level Minister. Devendra Fadnavis' is Current Deputy Chief Minister of Maharashtra And Minister of Planning.

Head office

List of Cabinet Ministers

 List of Ministers of State 

List of Principal Secretary

Organizational structure
Cabinet minister is head of the department. Cabinet minister is assisted by the Minister of State. Secretary from Indian Administrative Service cadre is responsible for execution of policies.

Directorate of Economics and Statistics
Special directorate is responsible for collecting statistics in Maharashtra for planning purpose.
Functions of DES 
Collect official statistics
Data collection through surveys, 
Censuses 
Publish statistical publications regularly
Offer training to statistical personnel
Co-ordinate the work of statistical sections in different departments
Directorate also acts as liaison between Government of India and Government of Maharashtra.

Maharashtra Remote Sensing Application Centre (MRSAC)
MRSAC is an autonomous body under Ministry of Planning. MRSAC is a Nodal Agency for designing a Maharashtra Geo-Spatial Digital Database System-(MGDDS)''. Farm yields are improved in Maharashtra using artificial intelligence and satellite images.

References

External links

Government ministries of Maharashtra
Economic planning in India